Zurella is a Thoroughbred mare trained in New Zealand by Shaune Ritchie. She is winner of the 2012 Let's Elope Stakes, and finished second in the 2012 New Zealand Oaks.

References

2008 racehorse births
Racehorses bred in New Zealand
Racehorses trained in New Zealand
Thoroughbred family 8